Spy Myung-wol is a 2011 South Korean television series starring Han Ye-seul, Eric Mun, and Lee Jin-wook. It aired on KBS2 from July 11 to September 6, 2011 on Mondays and Tuesdays at 21:55 for 18 episodes.

Plot
Han Myung-wol is a North Korean spy who infiltrates the South under orders to kidnap popular hallyu actor Kang Woo, only to end up falling in love with him.

Cast
Han Ye-seul as Han Myung-wol
Eric Mun as Kang Woo 
  as teenage Kang Woo
Lee Jin-wook as Choi Ryu
Jang Hee-jin as Joo In-ah
Lee Deok-hwa as Chairman Joo
Jo Hyung-ki as Han Hee-bok
Yu Ji-in as Rhee Ok-soon
Lee Kyun as Lee Dae-kang
Park Hyun-sook as Kyung Jae-in
Shin Seung-hwan as Bang Geuk-bong
Son Eun-seo as Yoo Da-hae
Lee Byung-joon as Yoo Jung-shik
Lee Ji-hoon as Kwak Ji-tae
Cha Seung-joon as Jang Han-soo
Kim Ha-kyun as Kim Young-tak
Jung Da-hye as Kim Eun-joo
Kim Ga-young as Joo Kyung-joo
Kim Sung-oh as actor in action movie (cameo, ep 1)
Shin Bo-ra as participants in audition (cameo, ep 9 )
  as trainees (cameo, ep 9-10)

Ratings

Source: TNmS Media Korea

Soundtrack 
 사랑이 무서워 (Afraid of Love) (Title) – Bobby Kim
 세상 그 누구보다 (More Than Anyone in the World) – Lena Park
 더 사랑한다면 (If You Love Me More) – Ryeowook
 사랑 할 수 있을 때 – Bobby Kim and Gilme
 I LOVE YOU – Narsha feat. Miryo
 이 느낌
 스파이 명월
 하루
 I LOVE YOU (Inst.)
 사랑 할 수 있을 때 (Inst.)
 더 사랑한다면 (Inst.)
 세상 그 누구보다 (Inst.)
 사랑이 무서워 (Inst.)

Controversy
Following a dispute with director Hwang In-hyuk over her working conditions, Han Ye-seul failed to show up for her scheduled filming on August 14–15, 2011, then flew to the United States on August 16. Due to her absence, an episode was cancelled and instead a special featuring highlights of the series was aired. It was the first instance of a leading actor abruptly leaving in the middle of a Korean drama shoot. After extensive press coverage and threats of legal action, Han returned to the set on August 18 and apologized to her fans.

International broadcast

References

External links 
 Spy Myung-wol official KBS website 
 

Korean-language television shows
2011 South Korean television series debuts
2011 South Korean television series endings
Korean Broadcasting System television dramas
South Korean action television series
South Korean romance television series
Television series by Victory Contents